Corixa iberica is a species of water boatman in the family Corixidae in the order Hemiptera.

References

Insects described in 1981
Corixini